Simon Mark Arthur, 4th Baron Glenarthur, DL (born 7 October 1944), is a British peer, pilot and businessman. Having succeeded to his father's titles in 1976, he is one of the ninety hereditary peers elected to remain in the House of Lords after the House of Lords Act 1999, and sits as a Conservative.

Career
The son of The 3rd Baron Glenarthur, he was born into a Scottish mercantile family and was educated at Eton College. Commissioned to the 10th Royal Hussars in 1963, Glenarthur was Aide-de-Camp to the High Commissioner of Aden in 1964 and 1965. Between 1976 and 1980, he served as a Major in The Royal Hussars, Territorial and Army Volunteer Reserve, and was Captain for British Airways Helicopters between 1976 and 1982.

Lord Glenarthur served in the government of Margaret Thatcher in the House of Lords, and in 1982 became a Lord-in-waiting (Government Whip) and became Parliamentary Under Secretary of State at the Department of Health and Social Security (DHSS) in 1983. He then moved to the Home Office before being promoted to Minister of State for Scotland in 1986. His last ministerial appointment was as Minister of State for Foreign and Commonwealth Affairs from 1987 to 1989. Amongst his particular responsibilities were Hong Kong and the United Kingdom's relationship with China.

From 1977 to 1982, Lord Glenarthur was director of Aberdeen and Texas Corporate Finance Ltd and from 1979 to 1982 for ABTEX Computer Systems Ltd. He was Senior Executive of Hanson plc from 1989 to 1996, Deputy Chairman of Hanson Pacific Ltd from 1994 to 1998 and director of Whirly Bird Services Ltd from 1995 to 2004. He was further consultant to British Aerospace from 1989 to 1999 and President of the National Council for Civil Protection from 1991 to 2003. For the British Helicopter Advisory Board, he was chairman between 1992 and 2004, and is its president since 2004. Lord Glenarthur was director of Lewis Group in 1993 and 1994, was consultant to Chevron UK Ltd from 1994 to 1997 and director of Millennium Chemicals from 1996 to 2004. He was also consultant to Hanson plc from 1996 to 1999 and to the Imperial Tobacco Group plc from 1996 to 1998, chairman of the European Helicopter Association from 1996 to 2003 and of the International Federation of Helicopter Associations from 1997 to 2004, and is governor of the Nuffield Hospitals since 2000. Between 2001 and 2002, he was consultant to Audax Trading Ltd, and director between 2003 and 2005. Since 2001, he has been Commissioner of the Royal Hospital Chelsea, since 2002 director of The Medical Defence Union and since 2005 director of Andax Global.

Glenarthur has been council member of The Air League since 1994 and was member of the National Employers Liaison Committee for Her Majesty's Reserve Forces from 1996 to 2002. Since 2002, he is also chairman of the National Employer Advisory Board for Britain's Reserve Forces. He is Lieutenant of the Royal Company of Archers, since 2002 Honorary Colonel of the 306 Field Hospital and since 2004 Honorary Air Commodore of the 612 (County of Aberdeen) Squadron, Royal Auxiliary Air Force. In 1992, Glenarthur became a Freeman of the Guild of Air Pilots and Air Navigators and in 1996 a Liveryman. Having been a member of the Chartered Institute of Logistics and Transport since 1978, he was made a Fellow in 1999. He is further a Fellow of the Royal Aeronautical Society since 1992, and a Freeman of the City of London since 1996.

On 1 August 2008, Glenarthur was awarded the Grand Cross of the Order of the Crown of Tonga by the King of Tonga in the Coronation honours list. 

Since 2010, Lord Glenarthur has been governor and a trustee of King Edward VII's Hospital Sister Agnes. In his role as governor, he wrote to the Australian radio station 2Day FM in the wake of their hoax call to the King Edward VII Hospital concerning the pregnancy of The Duchess of Cambridge, and the subsequent death of nurse Jacintha Saldanha who took the call. Glenarthur wrote that it was 'truly appalling' that the call was approved by radio management before broadcast.

Personal life
Glenarthur has been married to Susan Barry, a great-granddaughter of the Earl of Dunmore and a great-great-granddaughter of the Earl of Leicester, since 1969; they have one son, Edward Alexander Arthur, and one daughter.

Glenarthur is an active member of the Scottish Episcopal Church.

References

1944 births
Living people
Conservative Party (UK) Baronesses- and Lords-in-Waiting
Deputy Lieutenants of Aberdeenshire
Fellows of the Royal Aeronautical Society
People educated at Eton College
10th Royal Hussars officers
Royal Hussars officers
Honorary air commodores
Members of the Royal Company of Archers
Place of birth missing (living people)
Simon
Hereditary peers elected under the House of Lords Act 1999